Howard Bay may refer to:

Howard Bay (Antarctica), a body of water in Antarctica
Howard Bay (designer) (1912–1986), American scenic, lighting and costume designer